Hana no Furu Gogo (Japanese: 花の降る午後, Afternoon When Flowers Fell) is a 1989 film based on the 1988 novel of the same name by Teru Miyamoto. The film stars Yūko Kotegawa, Masahiro Takashima, and Junko Sakurada; with Shigeru Muroi, Akiji Kobayashi, Miyoko Akaza, Kaku Takashina, Eriko Tamura, Susumu Kurobe, Masato Furuoya, and Tatsuo Umemiya playing supporting roles. Kotegawa plays Noriko Kai, a 37-year-old widow who runs her late husband's restaurant Avignon. She meets and falls in love with 27-year-old painter Masamichi Takami, played by Takashima, while trying to save her restaurant Avignon from Yukio and Misa Araki.

Plot 
After the death of her husband, Yoshinao, in 1981, Noriko Kai has been managing the French restaurant Avignon in Kobe left by Yoshinao for four years. One day, Masamichi Takami, a young painter, visited the recreant and offered to give a painting called White House to Noriko, as well as to hold his own exhibition. However, a letter from Yoshinao was found on the back of this painting and revealed to Noriko that he had a hidden child. Around that time, waiters Shuichi Akitsu, Toshihiro Mizuno, and manager Naoe Hayama quit their jobs at Avignon over a scandal that happened. When Noriko consulting with her acquaintance, Doctor Wong Kin Ming, she finds out that Yukio and Misa Araki, a gambling and diamond smuggling couple, were trying to take over Avignon Noriko asks Yoshinao's best friend Kenichi Kudo, a private detective, to investigate the Araki couple, but the driver Koshiba and chef Katsuro Kaga were attacked and injured. Avignon was forced to close temporarily, but with the encouragement of Takami and the efforts of Kaga, reopened soon after. However, Misa plans to take Jill, the daughter of her neighbor Reed Brown, as a hostage to try to take the land, but Noriko sneaks into the Araki couple's cruiser party and rescues Jill. Misa then tries to reach out to Mika, Yoshinao's secret child, but Noriko confronts Misa convinces her to not go with the plan, saying that she knew her sadness. After, Mika suddenly visits Avignon, and Noriko warmly welcomes and watches over her.

Cast 
Yūko Kotegawa as Noriko Kai
Masahiro Takashima as Masamichi Takami
Junko Sakurada as Misa Araki, the wife of Yukio who wants to take over Avignon.
Masato Furuoya as Yoshinao Kai, Noriko's deceased husband.
Yūsuke Natsu as Yukio Araki, Misa's husband.
Shigeru Muroi as Huang Ume
Hiroshi Madoka as Kenichi Kudo
Akiji Kobayashi as Naoe Hayama
Miyoko Akaza as Yoshie Kaga
Kaku Takashina as Wong Kin Ming
Eriko Tamura as Mika Numata, Yoshinao's secret child.
Nao Asuka as Kazuko Matsuki
Susumu Kurobe as Seibei Matsuki
Tatsuo Umemiya as Katsuro Kaga

Production

Filming and release 
Filming took place in Kitano-chō, a district within Kobe. Sakurada and Kotegawa became friends during the filming. Because it was set and filmed in Kobe, it was set to release a month early on September 15 in the Kansai region.

Music 

The official soundtrack was produced by Haruki Kadokawa, which mostly consisted of songs composed by Kazuhiko Katō as well as three Carlos Toshiki & Omega Tribe songs, one of which being an original song used for the theme. The album was released by VAP on September 10, 1989.

Awards and nominations

References

External links